Gtranslator is a specialized computer-assisted translation software and po file editor for the internationalization and localization (i18n) of software that uses the gettext system. It handles all forms of gettext po files and includes features such as Find/Replace, Translation Memory, different Translator Profiles, Messages Table (for having an overview of the translations/messages in the po file), Easy Navigation and Editing of translation messages and comments of the translation where accurate. Gtranslator includes also a plugin system with plugins such as Alternate Language, Insert Tags, Open Tran, Integration with Subversion, and Source Code Viewer.
Gtranslator is written in the programming language C for the GNOME desktop environment. It is available as free software under the terms of the GNU General Public License (GPL).

Features
 Open several PO files in tabs
 Plural forms support
 Automatic headers update
 Comments editing
 Management of different translator profiles
 Translation Memories
 Assistant to configure initial profile and TM
 Search dialog and quick navigation among the messages
 Toolbar editor
 Highlight whitespaces and messages syntax
 Plugins system (from gedit)

Plugins
 Character Map: Insert special characters by clicking on them
 Dictionary: Look up words in a dictionary
 Alternate Language: Load another translation of the PO file in order to see at the same time the original messages and their translations in the alternate language
 Fullscreen: Place window in the fullscreen state
 Insert Params: Parameters detection and easy insertion
 Insert Tags: Tags detection and easy insertion
 Open Tran: Look for phrases in Open Tran memory translation database
 Source code view: Show the message in the source code
 Subversion: A Subversion client plugin based on libsvn

See also

 gettext

References

External links
 Project homepage

Free computer programming tools
Free software programmed in C
Software-localization tools
GNOME Applications
GNOME Developer Tools
Computer-assisted translation software that uses GTK
Computer-assisted translation software for Linux